The Blue Hussar is a 1950 novel by the French writer Roger Nimier. Set in Germany in 1945–1946, it tells the story of ten French hussars who operate in the French occupation army right after World War II. The perspective shifts between several different people. At the centre are the ambivalent François Sanders and his companion François Saint-Anne—the title character—who unknowingly share the same German mistress.

Sanders was also the main character of Nimier's previous novel, Les Épées from 1948. The Blue Hussar was published in English in 1952 translated by John Russell and Anhony Rhodes (publ. MacGibbon & Kee. UK) and then again in 1953, translated by Jacques Le Clercq (publ. Julian Messner, US).

Reception
Frank Alberts of The Saturday Review wrote that the book "will come as a blessed relief to readers fatigued by the leaden tones of much recent American war fiction. Nimier writes easily, has a gift for keeping his story on the move, and shows maturity in refusing to allow his ideas more space than they really deserve." Alberts praised the depiction of Sanders but was let down by Saint-Anne's storyline. He described the English translation as "short shrift".

Legacy
The novel gave name to the literary movement les Hussards. In a 1952 article for Les Temps modernes, the journalist Bernard Frank tried to define the movement and its extent. He identified Nimier as its leader and used Nimier's most famous novel to coin the movement's name.

References

External links
 The Blue Hussar at the French publisher's website 

1950 French novels
French-language novels
Novels by Roger Nimier
Novels set in the 1940s
Fiction set in 1945
Fiction set in 1946
Novels set in Germany
Novels about the military
Éditions Gallimard books